The Delatite River, an inland perennial river of the Goulburn Broken catchment, part of the Murray-Darling basin, is located in the lower South Eastern Highlands bioregion and Northern Country/North Central regions of the Australian state of Victoria. The headwaters of the Delatite River rise on the western slopes of the Victorian Alps and descend to flow into the Goulburn River within Lake Eildon.

Location and features

The Delatite River rises in Howqua Gap, between the ski resort mountains of Mount Stirling and Mount Buller, of the Great Dividing Range. The river flows generally westwards, initially through rugged national park and state forests and, as the river descends, through more open woodlands. The river descends  over its  course.

Etymology
In Australian Aboriginal languages, the river is variously named Wappang,  Callathera,  Kalylatherer or Kay-lath-er-rer, Pappang, and  Wapping with no defined meanings for each of the words.

The name of the river is derived from the name of the wife of a former local indigenous leader Beolite, the leader of the yowung-illum-baluks of the Taungurung people, in the Taungurung language.

See also

References

External links

Goulburn Broken catchment
Rivers of Hume (region)
Tributaries of the Goulburn River
Alpine National Park